Reece Wilson (born 11 June 1996) is a Scottish downhill mountain biker. In 2020, he won the MTB World Championships in Leogang, Austria. Wilson rode for the Trek Factory Downhill Team for the 2019 and 2020 seasons.

Major results
2020
 1st  Downhill, UCI Mountain Bike World Championships
2021
 UCI Downhill World Cup
1st Snowshoe

References

Living people
Downhill mountain bikers
1996 births
Scottish male cyclists
UCI Mountain Bike World Champions (men)